Kumbadjena shannonensis is a species of velvet worm in the Peripatopsidae family. This species has 15 pairs of legs. The type locality is in Western Australia.

References

Onychophorans of Australasia
Onychophoran species
Animals described in 2002